TFF Süper Kupa 2009 (English: TFF Super Cup) was the 37th edition the Turkish Super Cup since its establishment. This was the first time, Turkish Super Cup was held in Istanbul. The match was the first official football encounter in Turkey before the 2009–10 season, held on 2 August 2009, in Atatürk Olympic Stadium. The previous versions were organized in German cities of Frankfurt, Köln, and Duisburg.

Beşiktaş, the defending champions of both Süper Lig and Turkish Cup and Fenerbahçe, the finalist of Turkish Cup, were the competing sides for the triumphant.

The two teams had their first meeting for the cup in 2007, in which Fenerbahçe had won 2–1. Additionally, Istanbul rivals had faced each other in Atatürk Olympic Stadium for the first time.

There were injured players who missing the match of both sides; Delgado, Üzülmez and Dağ for Beşiktaş and, Roberto Carlos and Hurmacı for Fenerbahçe. Statistically, this encounter was the 324th one since of 85-year-long rivalry, in which Fenerbahçe lead in having the most wins, 120 to 119 that far, scoring 438 goals in total.

Match details

See also
 Süper Lig 2008-09

References

2009
Super Cup
Turkish Super Cup 2009
Turkish Super Cup 2009